The 1963–64 Austrian Hockey League season was the 34th season of the Austrian Hockey League, the top level of ice hockey in Austria. Seven teams participated in the league, and EC KAC won the championship.

Final round

5th-7th place

External links
Austrian Ice Hockey Association

Aus
Austrian Hockey League seasons
1963–64 in Austrian ice hockey